The 1978 Basque Pelota World Championships were the 8th edition of the Basque Pelota World Championships organized by  the FIPV.

Participating nations

Others

Events
A total of 12 events were disputed, in 4 playing areas.

Trinquete, 5 events disputed

Fronton (30 m), 2 events disputed

Fronton (36 m), 4 events disputed

Fronton (54 m), 1 event disputed

Medal table

References

World Championships,1978
1978 in sports
Sport in Biarritz
1978 in French sport
September 1978 sports events in Europe
International sports competitions hosted by France
World Championships,1978
World Championships